Robert Stokes may refer to:

Robert Stokes (animator) (1908–1980), American animator
Robert Stokes (politician) (1809–1880), member of the New Zealand Legislative Council
Robert Stokes (MP), member of parliament for Huntingdonshire
Robert Stokes Sr., Baltimore City Council member
Rob Stokes (born 1975), Australian politician
Bob Stokes (meteorologist) (born 1958), American meteorologist
Bob Stokes (American football) (1931–2019), American football and basketball player and coach
Bobby Stokes (1951–1995), English footballer
Robin Stokes (Robert Harold Stokes, 1918–2016), Australian chemist